Archidrepana is a monotypic moth genus belonging to the subfamily Drepaninae. This genus was erected by William Warren in 1902. Its only species, Archidrepana saturniata, described by the same author in the same year, is known from the Comoros (Grande Comore) and from Madagascar.

This species has a wingspan of 52 mm.

See also
 List of moths of the Comoros
 List of moths of Madagascar

References 

Drepaninae
Monotypic moth genera
Moths of Africa
Drepanidae genera